Leonardo "Leo" Aleixa da Costa (born April 15, 1984, in Rio de Janeiro, Brazil) is a Brazilian footballer.

Career 
Leo Costa made his professional debut for Semeando in the Campeonato Carioca. After, he played for Clube Atlético Castelo Branco and Cachoeiras.

In March 2010 Leo transferred to Volyn Lutsk.

Honours
 Volyn Lutsk
2 place in the Ukrainian First League: 2010

References

External links

 
 

1984 births
Living people
Brazilian expatriate footballers
Expatriate footballers in Ukraine
Ukrainian Premier League players
FC Volyn Lutsk players
Association football forwards
Footballers from Rio de Janeiro (city)
Brazilian footballers